Lyse Leduc (born September 17, 1938) is a Quebec politician, she previously served as the member for Mille-Îles in the Quebec National Assembly as a member of the Parti Québécois from 1994 until 2003.

Biography
Leduc was born in Montreal, the daughter of two teachers. She earned her certificate in art history and a certificate in andragogy from the Université de Montréal.

Leduc taught at the Montreal Catholic School Commission for twenty five years. She also served as Director General of the Intervention Council for Women's Access to Work.

Political career

Leduc ran in the 1989 Quebec provincial election for the seat of Mille-Îles and lost to the incumbent Jean-Pierre Bélisle, she ran again in 1994 Quebec provincial election, with Bélisle having chosen not to run again and the PQ winning the election, she won in a very tight contest.

During her time in office, Leduc founded and was president of the Network of Women Parliamentarians of the Americas.

Leduc was re-elected in 1998 Quebec provincial election by a reduced margin in another tight race. She did not seek re-election in 2003.

Electoral Record

Provincial

References 

1938 births
Living people
Parti Québécois MNAs
Politicians from Montreal
Université de Montréal alumni
Women MNAs in Quebec
20th-century Canadian politicians
20th-century Canadian women politicians
21st-century Canadian politicians
21st-century Canadian women politicians